Malcolm James Menin (born 26 September 1932) was Bishop of Knaresborough from 1986 to 1997.

Menin was educated at the Dragon School and University College, Oxford before studying for ordination at Cuddesdon College, Oxford. After curacies in Portsmouth and Fareham he was appointed vicar of St James's Norwich in 1962, an area which he was to be associated with for much of the rest of his life. He was also appointed as be Rural Dean of Norwich in 1981.
In 1982 he was also appointed an honorary canon of Norwich Cathedral and then appointment as the suffragan Bishop of Knaresborough in 1986. On retirement, he returned to Norwich where he remains active in church life.

References

 

1932 births
People educated at The Dragon School
Alumni of University College, Oxford
Bishops of Knaresborough
Living people